Lachhman Singh (10 January 1922 – 21 February 2006) was an Indian politician who was a Member of Parliament, representing Haryana in the Rajya Sabha the upper house of India's Parliament. He was a member of the Indian National Congress.

Singh died on 21 February 2006, at the age of 84.

References

1922 births
2006 deaths
Indian National Congress politicians
Rajya Sabha members from Haryana